Khosa may refer to:

People with the surname Khosa

 Asif Saeed Khan Khosa, Chief Justice of the Supreme Court of Pakistan since 31 December 2016
 Baldev Khosa, Indian film actor and politician
 Sardar Muhammad Muqeem Khan Khoso,former MNA in 1998
 Dost Muhammad Khosa (born 1973), former Muslim League politician, now Pakistan People's Party
 Mir Hazar Khan Khoso (1929–2021), Chief Justice of the Federal Shariat Court of Pakistan
 Rajan Khosa, Indian filmmaker
 Sukhvir Singh Khosa, Indian immigrant to Canada, litigant in Canada (Minister of Citizenship and Immigration) v Khosa
 Zulfiqar Ali Khosa (born 1935), former Governor of Punjab and chief of khosa tribe
 Latif Khosa, Governor of Punjab

Places
 Khoski Town District Badin, Sindh, Pakistan
 Khosa, Punjab, Pakistan
 Khosa, Shahkot, Punjab State, India
 Jamaitgarh Alias Khosa, Punjab, India

Other uses
 Khosa (tribe), a Baloch tribe
 Khosa Gotra, Indian clan among the Ahirs or Kashmiri Brahmins

See also
 
 Khas people
 Khasas
 Kosa (disambiguation)
 Xhosa (disambiguation)